Dan Bailey (born January 26, 1988) is a former American football placekicker. Bailey grew up in the Oklahoma City area and played college football at Oklahoma State University. Following the 2011 NFL Draft, Bailey signed with the Dallas Cowboys as an undrafted free agent. He spent seven years in Dallas, where he became the franchise's all-time leader in field goals made. He played for the Minnesota Vikings from 2018 to 2020.

Early years 
Born in Oklahoma City, Bailey grew up in Mustang, Oklahoma, and attended Southwest Covenant School where he was an all-state, all-conference kicker and a first-team all-city punter (as selected by The Oklahoman), while playing eight-man football.

As a senior, Bailey had 51 touchbacks in 61 kickoffs. He holds the high school state records for longest field goal (50 yards), most field goals in a season (seven) and career (14). He was also an individual state champion golfer. Bailey graduated from Southwest Covenant and was named valedictorian of the class of 2007.

College career 

Bailey originally accepted to walk on at University of Arkansas, in order to receive an academic scholarship that would cover his tuition. After losing the competition for the starting kicker job, he was approached by head coach Houston Nutt and told that he would have to pay his own way, so he wouldn't count toward the team's scholarship limit. Forced to leave the school, he spent one year out of college before walking on at Oklahoma State University.

As a true freshman in 2007, Bailey made 20-of-20 extra point kicks but only two-of-four field goals. Bailey made field goals from 27 and 28-yards and missed two attempts beyond 40-yards.

Until the 2008 Holiday Bowl, Bailey made 10 consecutive field goals in his second year (2008). With a 78.9% field goal conversion rate (15-for-19) on the season, he was second in the Big 12 Conference in field goal percentage. He made a career-long 45-yarder in the 2008 Holiday Bowl, a 42-31 loss to Oregon.

Bailey made 46-of-46 extra point attempts and 13-of-18 field goals in 2009 as a junior. In the October 17 game, a 33-17 win over Missouri, he made 4-of-4 field goals, including a career-long 51-yarder.

In 2010, Bailey made 24-of-28 field goals and 65-of-66 extra points. He won the Lou Groza Award for the nation's top kicker following the season. He earned the Big 12 Special Teams Player of the Year award. Oklahoma State won the December 2010 Alamo Bowl 36-10 over Arizona, and Bailey made three of three field goals in that game: from 40, 50, and 44-yards.

Collegiate statistics

Professional career

Dallas Cowboys

2011 season 
Bailey was signed by the Dallas Cowboys as an undrafted free agent following the 2011 NFL Draft on July 25. At one point during training camp, he had to compete with three other place kickers who included David Buehler, Shayne Graham and Dave Rayner. Bailey was named the team's kicker at the end of the preseason, with Buehler remaining on the roster as the kickoff specialist.

In the second game of the regular season, against the San Francisco 49ers, after missing a chip shot attempt in the first quarter, he made a 48-yard field goal to send the game into overtime, and the eventual game-winner from 19 yards.

In Week 3, an 18–16 win over the Washington Redskins, Bailey tied a rookie record by converting six field goals (accounting for all of Dallas' points). This was the first time since 2001 that the Cowboys won a game without scoring a touchdown and the sixth in club history. He became the third rookie in NFL history to make six field goals in a game, following in the footsteps of Garo Yepremian, who converted six-of-eight attempts on November 13, 1966, for the Detroit Lions, and Jeff Reed, who made all six tries on December 1, 2002, for the Pittsburgh Steelers. This performance earned him NFC Special Teams Player of the Week honors.

On November 20 (Week 11), Bailey kicked his second game-winning field goal, a 39-yard kick in overtime to help the Cowboys beat the Redskins 27-24.

Bailey missed a potential game-winning 49-yard field goal during the December 4 (Week 13) game against the Arizona Cardinals. With the game tied 13-13, with six seconds left in the fourth quarter, Cowboys head coach Jason Garrett called a time-out before the snap, but Bailey's kick was good. Following the time-out, Bailey kicked the field goal short and to the left, leaving many Cowboys fans frustrated, convinced Garrett had just iced his own kicker. In overtime, the Cardinals won 19-13 on a touchdown by LaRod Stephens-Howling.

On December 11 (Week 14), however, in a game against the New York Giants with the Cowboys trailing 37-34, Bailey's first attempt at a game-tying 47-yard field goal was interrupted when Giants coach Tom Coughlin called a time-out, effectively icing the kicker. Bailey's first kicked ball did go through the uprights. However, Giants defensive end Jason Pierre-Paul blocked Bailey's kick after the Giants' timeout.

Bailey completed one of the best kicking seasons in franchise and league history by a rookie, making 32-of-37 (86.5%) field goals, second-highest kicking percentage for a rookie, setting a Cowboys rookie record for most field goals made in a game (6), tying Chris Boniol for the second-most consecutive field goals made (26) in club history, and was named to the Pro Football Writers Association All-Rookie team.

2012 season 
Bailey converted three field goals from distances of 32, 26, and 22-yards in Week 3 (September 23), a 16-10 win over the Tampa Bay Buccaneers. His last field goal in the game put Dallas up 16-7, a two-possession lead with 2:47 left. Dallas lost the Week 6 (October 14) game 31-29 to the Baltimore Ravens after Bailey missed a last-second, 51-yard field goal. With 32 seconds left, Tony Romo completed a four-yard touchdown pass to Dez Bryant, but because the following two-point conversion failed, Bailey had to make an onside kick. Dallas recovered the kick, but his 51-yard field goal attempt sailed wide right with six seconds remaining.

The following game (Week 7, October 21) against the Carolina Panthers, Bailey kicked 28 and 38-yard field goals within the final four minutes in Dallas' 19-14 victory. In the Week 11 (November 18) 23-20 overtime win over the Cleveland Browns, he made the game tying 32-yard field goal with two seconds left in regulation and the winning 38-yard field goal in overtime.

After trailing the Cincinnati Bengals 19-10 with 6:35 left, Dallas beat Cincinnati 20-19 in Week 14 (December 9). The fourth quarter comeback consisted of a touchdown pass by Romo and a last-second 40-yard field goal by Bailey.

In the Week 15 game on December 16 against the Pittsburgh Steelers, Bailey hit a game-winning 21-yard field goal following a 36-yard interception return by Brandon Carr. In overtime, the Cowboys won 27-24. This win kept the Cowboys' postseason hopes alive.

Bailey finished the 2012 season converting all 37 extra point attempts and 29 of 31 field goal attempts.

2013 season 
Bailey set the franchise record for most field goals over 50 yards for a single season (6) and a career (11). In the 2013 season, Bailey converted all 47 extra point attempts and 28 of 30 field goal attempts.

2014 season 
On January 23, Bailey and the Cowboys agreed on a new seven-year contract. His new contract was reported to be worth $22.5 million with a $4 million signing bonus and a total of $6.6 million in guaranteed money.

On September 21, Bailey set a franchise record with his 28th consecutive field goal, making a 40-yard attempt in the third quarter against the St. Louis Rams.

On October 5, he missed a potential game-winning 53-yard field goal against the Houston Texans at the end of regulation, breaking a franchise record streak of 30 consecutive makes dating back to the previous season. Bailey kicked the game-winning 49-yard field goal in overtime.

On October 12, Bailey became the most-accurate kicker in NFL history with a 42-yard made field goal in the second quarter of the Cowboys' 30-23 eventual win over the Seattle Seahawks. He has since dropped to twelfth on the all time list, on which the top six players are all currently active. He converted all 56 extra point attempts and 25 of 29 field goal attempts in the 2014 season.

2015 season 
Bailey moved into second place in franchise history with 182 career extra points, passing Mike Clark after making three against the New York Giants in the season opener.

On December 7, he made four of four field goals, including a game-winning 54-yard field goal with seconds remaining, to lift the Cowboys to a 19-16 win over the Washington Redskins in Week 13 on Monday Night Football. This performance earned him his second NFC Special Teams Player of the Week award.

Bailey was selected to his first career Pro Bowl in December, after making a career-high 93.8% of his field goal attempts, including being perfect (19-for-19) from 39-yards or closer. After the NFL decided to move back the extra point distance from the two-yard line to the 15-yard line, he responded by making a perfect mark of 25-of-25.

2016 season 
In the 2016 season opener, Bailey made four field goals in the 20–19 loss to the New York Giants. He connected on field goals of 54 and 56-yards. On October 16, he made three field goals against the Green Bay Packers. He recorded his 23rd career game with three or more field goals made, which is the most in team history. On December 18, he kicked six field goals against the Tampa Bay Buccaneers, making four and missing two. These misses marked the second occasion of his career that he had missed two attempts in a game; the previous occasion had been in 2011. In the 2016 season, Bailey converted all 16 extra point attempts and 27 of 32 field goal attempts.

2017 season 
Bailey recorded his 28th career game of three or more made field goals by converting all four attempts in the season-opening 19-3 victory over the New York Giants on NBC Sunday Night Football. The following week, he tied his career long with a 56-yard field goal in a 42–17 loss to the Denver Broncos. Week 3, versus the Arizona Cardinals, marked just the 10th game in Bailey's career in which he did not attempt a field goal. In week 7, he injured his right groin against the San Francisco 49ers.

He returned to play on the Thanksgiving game against the Los Angeles Chargers, but would struggle in the following weeks. Against the New York Giants he missed two field goals and one extra point in a 30–10 win. Against the Seattle Seahawks, in a game the Cowboys needed to win to keep their playoff aspirations alive, he made a 51-yard field goal after hitting the left upright and missed two additional field goals, which could have helped the team stay closer in an ultimately season-ending 21-12 loss. In the season finale against the Philadelphia Eagles, he missed one extra point and one field goal in a 6-0 win.

Before his injury, Bailey had been the most accurate kicker in NFL history among players with at least 100 attempts, but fell behind Justin Tucker. He converted 15-of-20 field goals (75%) and 26-of-28 extra point attempts (92.9%) during the season.

2018 season 
Although Bailey was coming off his worst season, his September 1 release by the Cowboys was nonetheless considered a surprise move, after the team decided to keep Canadian Football League journeyman Brett Maher, who had a solid preseason (including a 57-yard field goal) yet had never kicked in an NFL regular-season game. Bailey had made his only attempt in the preseason (a 35-yard field goal).

The team saved $3.4 million against the salary cap with the move. He left the Cowboys as the second-most-accurate kicker in NFL history (88.2%). Bailey also holds the Cowboys' record for most consecutive extra points made (275), most consecutive field goals made (30) and career field goals (186).

Minnesota Vikings

2018 season 
On September 17, 2018, the Minnesota Vikings signed Bailey to replace rookie Daniel Carlson, after Carlson missed three field goals in a Week 2 game against the Green Bay Packers. Bailey would go on to have another poor season, converting just 21 of  28 field goal attempts (75%), including only 5 of 11 attempts (45.4%) from 40 yards or more – this reduced productivity matched the previous year, as his percentage of overall field goals made was exactly the same.

2019 season 
On March 19, 2019, Bailey re-signed with the Vikings. He struggled during the preseason, forcing the Vikings to trade a fifth round draft choice to the Baltimore Ravens in exchange for kicker Kaare Vedvik. Bailey would end up winning the kicking competition and Vedvik was released on August 31.

In Week 5, against the New York Giants, Bailey converted all four field goals and both extra points, earning him NFC Special Teams Player of the Week. In Week 8, against the Washington Redskins, he made four field goals and an extra point in the 19–9 win en route to another NFC Special Teams Player of the Week award. In Week 15, Bailey converted all four field goal attempts and three of four extra point attempts against the Los Angeles Chargers in the 39–10 victory. He earned NFC Special Teams Player of the Week for the third time in the 2015 season.

Bailey had a rebound season, re-establishing himself as a notable placekicker, converting 27 of 29 field goals (93.1%), although he had a career-low average in extra points, making 40 of 44 attempts (90.9%).

2020 season
On March 23, 2020, Bailey re-signed with the Vikings on a three-year, $10 million contract. However, he struggled mightily during the season, going just 15 of 22 on field goals for a career low 68.1%, and just 37 of 43 on extra points for a career low 86%. He was better hitting field goals inside 40 yards, making 9 of 10 (90%). He was released from the Vikings on March 9, 2021.

NFL career statistics

See also 
 List of NCAA major college football yearly scoring leaders

References

External links 

 Oklahoma State Cowboys bio

1988 births
Living people
People from Mustang, Oklahoma
Sportspeople from Oklahoma City
Players of American football from Oklahoma
American football placekickers
Oklahoma State Cowboys football players
Dallas Cowboys players
Minnesota Vikings players
Unconferenced Pro Bowl players